Liberation is the fourth studio album by American singer-songwriter Mya. It was intended to be Harrison's debut release with her then new record label Universal Motown following her departure from Interscope in 2005. Before leaving, she had begun work on an album for Interscope called Control Freak set for a summer release 2005 with production by a host of other producers. Ultimately, she decided to leave A&M and Interscope Records and her management; subsequently Harrison made the transition within Universal Music Group to Universal Motown.

Within a three-month period Harrison had completed and submitted Liberation to her new label. Production on the album, which was classified as "energetic [and] ghetto" with a less classic R&B edge, was primarily handled by Scott Storch and J.R. Rotem with additional contributions from Bryan Michael Cox, Kwame, Carvin & Ivan, longtime contributor Tricky Stewart, and a handful of others. Guest appearances included Long Beach native Snoop Dogg, Murder Inc. rapper Charlie Baltimore and New Orleans rapper Lil Wayne.

Liberation spawned two singles, the Storch collaboration "Lock U Down" and R&B ballad "Ridin'". Both singles failed to make an impact at radio and on the charts. Due to the industry's budget cuts, the album suffered numerous delays and pushbacks. However while delaying the album's release again Universal Motown accidentally leaked the album in Japan, and Liberation was subsequently released as a digital download only in Japan on October 22, 2007. Liberation marked Harrison's only release on Universal Motown label following her departure in 2008.

Conception and production
Aside from several recording pauses, Mya had been working on her fourth studio album since 2004. Originally conceived as a project called Control Freak, the main production of the album was initially financed by A&M Records, following Mya's departure from the Interscope label after the mediocre commercial success of her previous effort Moodring in 2003, and expected to involve contributions by producers and songwriters Scott Storch, Dr. Dre, Jodeci, Lil Jon, Rockwilder and songwriter Sean Garrett. Mya, who took control of the album in her own hands by producing part of the record herself, described the album as "a combination of a Gwen Stefani, because it's energetic, and Lil Jon, very ghetto," with a less classic R&B edge, explaining further: "Control Freak is basically learning how to gain control of a situation yourself, gaining control in order to be [a] free and beautiful person in life." However, although she intended to release a dance track called "Let It Go" at a particular time, she eventually decided to leave both her management and A&M Records in fall 2005 due to personal differences, before signing a new contract with Universal Motown.

During the following months Mya began consulting a few other producers to collaborate on the album, renamed Liberation, including Tim & Bob, Bryan Michael Cox, Kwamé, J. R. Rotem and Tricky Stewart. In search of a new vibe for the album, she drew inspiration by leaving Los Angeles, California and moving back to Washington, D.C., where she spent her formative years. "I just knew that I had to get back to my roots and rediscover what had made me excited in the first place," she said in an interview with Billboard magazine. "I have all this creative energy and all these ideas but LA it was too impersonal of a place to develop a real creative family." Back home, Mya bought a house and enlisted her brother to build a recording studio, where she began experimenting, laying down rudimentary tracks and learning how to engineer. Pushed by her newfound abilities in mixing and production, Mya once again intensified work on the re-worked Control Freak album, with most of it eventually being completed in a stretch of only three month. "It was an easy process because I knew what I wanted to do when I went in," she commented, comparing the making of the album with a therapy. "I've been honest with myself and have been able to admit some things and analyze myself and save myself at the end of the day [...] Liberation is a clean slate; my most expressive, vulnerable album."

Music and compositions
Liberation opens with "I Am", a throbbing uptempo song produced by Kwamé. One of the first songs recorded for Liberation, Mya recalled creating it "kind of therapy" and described it as "very grown and sexy, very spring time, just an all-around feel-good record." Early versions of the song featured guest vocals by St. Louis rapper Penelope Jones instead of Charlie Baltimore. "Walka Not a Talka" incorporates an organic Cali ambiance and harks back to the exoticism of Britney Spears's "I'm a Slave 4 U". It begins with the sound of a siren, while Mya addresses listeners by saying, “I never should’ve left you.” Lyrically, the reflective song chronicles a self-conversation with Mya reminding of all the things she had to get rid of in order to get what she want in life. West Coast rapper Snoop Dogg appears as a guest vocalist on the track. Aggressive "Still A Woman" tells the story an independent woman who needs a man's touch at the end of the day, declaring that she's "always on the hustle doing what a man would do".

"No Touchin'" is a seductive mid-tempo ballad, produced by Konvict inhouse musician Noel "Detail" Fisher. It combines ancient tribal beats and oriental sounds. Similarly, "Lock U Down" featuring Lil Wayne mixes a prominent Eastern harp sample with a guitar riff. A street-but-sweet hip-hop soul jam, it exposes what kind of man a woman wants and needs. "Lights Go Off" is a slow jam, produced by duo Carvin & Ivan, that features Mya adopting a low, subtle vocal tone. Built around a piano, the song starts out with Mya's man leaving her a voice message and ends with another girl answering Mya's boyfriends phone. Ballad "Ridin'" is a break-up throwback to her earlier work in the late 1990s and was inspired by a former relationship in which Mýa suspected her ex-boyfriend of cheating. Frustrated and fed-up with the situation, it details her traffic route past the homes of people important to her man, including his mother, ex-girlfriends, and new lover.

The Carvin & Ivan-produced "Switch It Up" served as the album's ninth track. With a hard hand clap beat and hard lyrics to match, "Switch It Up" shows Mya's man a different side to her. She's being his waitress, his mistress, his everything, but not for long. She's being all these things as a soon to be slap in the face for cheating on her. Mya continues to "Switch It Up" until the end of the song when she begins a little rap verse. Track ten, "Give a Chick a Hand" is a new kind of futuristic crunk sound of music. A different approach to the typical "she stole my man" song, Mya is actually giving kudos to the woman who stole her man. She knows she's hot, but wants to learn how the next woman actually got what was hers. "All in the Name of Love", the album's eleventh track was produced by J. R. Rotem and samples the theme song from the horror film Halloween (1978). Produced by Bryan-Michael Cox, "Life's Too Short" begins with the sound of piano. Mya expresses that she is not going to dwell on anything bad that has happened in her past and is forgetting things that do not matter, expressing that "life is too short for tears". Liberations final track, "Nothin' at All", was a "pleasant way" to end the album, Rap-Up noted. Produced by Tricky Stewart, "Nothin' at All" sounds like snap music but in slow motion. In the song, Mya addresses plenty of issues that have occurred in her life in the industry. Rap-Up commented, "in this ballad, she clearly is singing her soul out. You can hear and feel her passion. Every line of the song has meaning behind it, even when she sings, 'What don't kill you makes you stronger, stand up longer.'"

Release and promotion

A release date for her Mya's fourth studio album was first suggested in February 2005, when she expressed her intention of releasing it the same year on her longtime label A&M Records through its partnership with Interscope under the Universal umbrella. In June, she confirmed in an interview with MTV News that recording for the album was concluding and she was looking at a late summer release for her the album, tentatively titled Control Freak then, with a first single "Let It Go" to drop soon. However, in January 2006, Billboard magazine announced that the singer had left A&M Records in 2005 to transition to Universal Motown Records, then headed by Sylvia Rhone. While much of the earlier material recorded under A&M was left with the label, Mya set up new recording sessions for her fourth album and renamed it Liberation.

In September 2006, promotional single "Ayo!" was released. Although two further singles from the albums followed throughout the following year, Liberation was repeatedly bumped from the US schedule, lastly in September 2007. Mya attributed the delay to "litigations, court, transitioning from label to label, teaching kids [at the Mya Art & Tech Foundation] and building a studio" at first, also citing business related differences as a reason for its push backs. "It's just business you know [...] The music industry is suffering so record companies have to scrap for money. Plus I would rather wait for them to get it right before I do an album." In October 2007, Liberation was accidentally released to the Japanese music market due to label changing the release date again, leading to its overall leak on the Internet. As a result, Universal Motown decided to shelf a physical CD release elsewhere as the company feared that heavy bootlegging would affect sales.

Though Liberation was never released officially. Harrison heavily promoted the album. First, she headlined the 8th annual Seagram's Live Tour with rap duo Clipse. Next, she was featured on the 2007's BET Black College Tour where she performed at various historical black universities. Mya was invited to perform at the WNBA's All-Star festivities where she performed a medley of her hits as well as a new song "Still A Woman" during the game's halftime show.

Singles
Universal Motown issued a three singles from Liberation. Initially, "Ayo!" was intended to be the album's first single, however the single was scrapped. Produced by Chris "Deep" Henderson, the go-go inspired "Ayo!" featuring DJ Kool was released August 21, 2006 and peaked at number seventy on the Hot R&B/Hip-Hop Songs chart. A music video was planned, however nothing ever materialized. Next up, the street but sweet hip-hop soul jam "Lock U Down" featuring Lil Wayne. Released March 27, 2007, the song was appointed as the album's official first single. A Scott Storch production, the single peaked at number 101 on the bubbling under Hot R&B/Hip-Hop Songs chart only. A commercial failure due to poor radio airplay and lack of promotion thus delaying the album's release. Ballad "Ridin" was the second and final single taken from Liberation and peaked at number fifty-eight on the Hot R&B/Hip-Hop Songs chart. Though the single fared better than its predecessor, it received little radio support and general promotion as well. Universal Motown had also planned to release "Walka Not a Talka" as a single at some point. David LaChapelle was originally supposed to direct a music video for the song, with Patricia Field consulted for styling—but the then-head of marketing of the label thought it was "too weird".

Reception

Reviewed by a few American critics only, Liberation garnered a generally mixed reception. Dorian Lynskey of Blender magazine gave the album two and a half stars out of five, stating: "A decade into her career, two songs raise the 27-year-old's game—the insidious snake-charmer melody of "'Walka Not a Talka' and the bracing blast of betrayed-housewife rage of 'All in the Name of Love.' Elsewhere, boilerplate slow jams and generic sass paint Mya, her claims to the contrary, as a talka not a walka." Writing for Vibe, Julianne Shepherd gave Liberation a favorable review, noting, "on her fourth album Mya breaks out and swaggers into an intriguing new role".

Track listing

Notes
  signifies a co-producer

Tour

References

2007 albums
Mýa albums
Universal Motown Records albums
Albums produced by J. R. Rotem
Albums produced by Detail (record producer)
Albums produced by Scott Storch
Albums produced by Tricky Stewart